Carolly Erickson (born January 1, 1943) is an American author of historical fiction and non-fiction. She lives in Hawaii. In 2008, her book The Tsarina's Daughter won the RT Reader's Choice Award for best Historical Fiction.

Novels
 The Hidden Diary of Marie Antoinette (2005)
 The Last Wife of Henry VIII (2006)
 The Secret Life of Josephine: Napoleon's Bird of Paradise (2007)
 The Tsarina's Daughter (2008)
 The Memoirs of Mary Queen of Scots (2009)
 Rival to the Queen (2010)
  The Favored Queen (2011)
 The Unfaithful Queen (2012)
 The Spanish Queen (2013)

Non fiction
The Records of Medieval Europe (1971)
The Medieval Vision: Essays in History And Perception (1976)
Bloody Mary: The Life of Mary Tudor (1978)
Civilization and society in the West (1978)
Josephine: A Life of the Empress (1980)
Great Harry: The Extravagant Life of Henry Viii (1980)
Royal Panoply: Brief Lives of the English Monarchs (1980) (Brief Lives of the English Monarchs (2007)
The First Elizabeth (1983)
Mistress Anne (1984)
Our Tempestuous Day: A History of Regency England (1986)
Bonnie Prince Charlie (1989)
To the Scaffold: The Life of Marie Antoinette (1991)
Great Catherine: The Life of Catherine the Great, Empress of Russia (1994)
Her Little Majesty: The Life of Queen Victoria (1997)
Arc of the Arrow: Writing Your Spiritual Autobiography (1998)
Alexandra: The Last Tsarina (2001)
The Girl From Botany Bay (2004)
Lilibet: An Intimate Portrait Of Elizabeth II (2004)

References

1943 births
Living people
American historical fiction writers
Women historical novelists
Writers of historical fiction set in the early modern period